Taiwan, officially the Republic of China (ROC), is a country in East Asia. It is located at the junction of the East and South China Seas in the northwestern Pacific Ocean, with the People's Republic of China (PRC) to the northwest, Japan to the northeast, and the Philippines to the south. The capital, Taipei, forms along with New Taipei City and Keelung, the largest metropolitan area in Taiwan. Other major cities include Taoyuan, Taichung, Tainan, and Kaohsiung. With around 23.9 million inhabitants, Taiwan is among the most densely populated countries in the world.

Taiwan has been settled for at least 25,000 years. Ancestors of Taiwanese indigenous peoples settled the island around 6,000 years ago. In the 17th century, large-scale Han Chinese (specifically the Hakkas and Hoklos) immigration to western Taiwan began under a Dutch colony and continued under the Kingdom of Tungning, the first predominantly Han Chinese state in Taiwanese history. The island was annexed in 1683 by the Qing dynasty of China and ceded to the Empire of Japan in 1895. The Republic of China, which had overthrown the Qing in 1911, took control of Taiwan following the surrender of Japan in 1945. Japan would renounce sovereignty over Taiwan in 1952. The immediate resumption of the Chinese Civil War resulted in the loss of the Chinese mainland to Communist forces, who established the People's Republic of China and the flight of the ROC central government to Taiwan in 1949. The effective jurisdiction of the ROC has since been limited to Taiwan, Penghu, and smaller islands.

In the early 1960s, Taiwan entered a period of rapid economic growth and industrialisation called the "Taiwan Miracle". In the late 1980s and early 1990s, the ROC transitioned from a one-party state under martial law to a multi-party democracy, with democratically elected presidents since 1996. Taiwan's export-oriented industrial economy is the 21st-largest in the world by nominal GDP and the 19th-largest by PPP measures, with a focus on steel, machinery, electronics, and chemicals manufacturing. Taiwan is a developed country, ranking 20th on GDP per capita. It is ranked highly in terms of civil liberties, healthcare, and human development.

The political status of Taiwan is contentious. The ROC no longer represents China as a member of the United Nations after UN members voted in 1971 to recognize the PRC instead. The ROC maintained its claim of being the sole legitimate representative of China and its territory, although this has been downplayed since its democratization in the 1990s. Taiwan is claimed by the PRC, which refuses to establish diplomatic relations with countries that recognise the ROC. Taiwan maintains official diplomatic relations with 13 out of 193 UN member states and the Holy See, though many others maintain unofficial diplomatic ties through representative offices and institutions that function as de facto embassies and consulates. International organisations in which the PRC participates either refuse to grant membership to Taiwan or allow it to participate only on a non-state basis under various names. Domestically, the major political contention is between parties favouring eventual Chinese unification and promoting a pan-Chinese identity, contrasted with those aspiring to formal international recognition and promoting a Taiwanese identity; into the 21st century, both sides have moderated their positions to broaden their appeal.

Etymology

Name of the island
Various names for the island of Taiwan remain in use, each derived from explorers or rulers during a particular historical period. 

In his Daoyi Zhilüe (1349), Wang Dayuan used "Liuqiu" as a name for the island of Taiwan, or the part of it closest to Penghu. Elsewhere, the name was used for the Ryukyu Islands in general or Okinawa, the largest of the islands; the name Ryūkyū is the Japanese form of Liúqiú. The name also appears in the Book of Sui (636) and other early works, but scholars cannot agree on whether these references are to the Ryukyus, Taiwan or even Luzon.

The name Formosa dates from 1542, when Portuguese sailors sighted an uncharted island and noted it on their maps as Ilha Formosa ("beautiful island"). The name Formosa eventually "replaced all others in European literature" and remained in common use among English speakers into the 20th century.

In 1603, a Chinese expedition fleet anchored at a place in Taiwan called Dayuan, a variant of "Taiwan", and met with the native chieftain named Damila. In the early 17th century, the Dutch East India Company established a commercial post at Fort Zeelandia (modern-day Anping, Tainan) on a coastal sandbar called "Tayouan", after their ethnonym for a nearby Taiwanese aboriginal tribe, possibly Taivoan people, written by the Dutch and Portuguese variously as Taiouwang, Tayowan, Teijoan, etc. This name was also adopted into the Chinese vernacular (in particular, Hokkien, as ) as the name of the sandbar and nearby area (Tainan). The modern word "Taiwan" is derived from this usage, which is written in different transliterations ( and ) in Chinese historical records. The area occupied by modern-day Tainan was the first permanent settlement by both European colonists and Chinese immigrants. The settlement grew to be the island's most important trading centre and served as its capital until 1887.

Use of the current Chinese name became official as early as 1684 during the Qing dynasty with the establishment of Taiwan Prefecture centered in modern-day Tainan. Through its rapid development the entire Taiwanese mainland eventually became known as "Taiwan".

Name of the country
The official name of the country in English is the "Republic of China"; it has also been known under various names throughout its existence. The name of the Republic had stemmed from the party manifesto of Tongmenghui in 1905, which says the four goals of the Chinese revolution was "to expel the Manchu rulers, to revive Chunghwa, to establish a Republic, and to distribute land equally among the people.()." The convener of Tongmenghui and Chinese revolutionary leader Sun Yat-sen proposed the name Chunghwa Minkuo as the assumed name of the new country when the revolution succeeded.

During the 1950s and 1960s, after the ROC government had withdrawn to Taiwan upon losing the Chinese Civil War, it was commonly referred to as "Nationalist China" (or "Free China") to differentiate it from "Communist China" (or "Red China"). It was a member of the United Nations representing China until 1971, when the ROC lost its seat to the People's Republic of China. Over subsequent decades, the Republic of China has become commonly known as "Taiwan", after the main island. In some contexts, including ROC government publications, the name is written as "Republic of China (Taiwan)", "Republic of China/Taiwan", or sometimes "Taiwan (ROC)".

The Republic of China participates in most international forums and organizations under the name "Chinese Taipei" as a compromise with the People's Republic of China (PRC). For instance, it is the name under which it has participated in the Olympic Games as well as the APEC.  "Taiwan authorities" is sometimes used by the PRC to refer to the current government in Taiwan.

History

Early settlement (to 1683)

Taiwan was joined to the Asian mainland in the Late Pleistocene, until sea levels rose about 10,000 years ago. Fragmentary human remains dated 20,000 to 30,000 years ago have been found on the island, as well as later artifacts of a Paleolithic culture. These people were similar to the negritos of the Philippines.

Around 6,000 years ago, Taiwan was settled by farmers, most likely from what is now southeast China. 
They are believed to be the ancestors of today's Taiwanese indigenous peoples, whose languages belong to the Austronesian language family, but show much greater diversity than the rest of the family, which spans a huge area from Maritime Southeast Asia west to Madagascar and east as far as New Zealand, Hawaii and Easter Island. This has led linguists to propose Taiwan as the urheimat of the family, from which seafaring peoples dispersed across Southeast Asia and the Pacific and Indian Oceans. Trade links with the Philippines subsisted from the early 2nd millennium BC, including the use of jade from eastern Taiwan in the Philippine jade culture. The raw jade from Taiwan which was further processed in the Philippines was the basis for Taiwanese-Philippine commerce with ancient Vietnam, Malaysia, Brunei, Singapore, Thailand, Indonesia, and Cambodia.

Han Chinese fishermen had settled on the Penghu Islands by 1171, when a group of "Bisheye" bandits with dark skin speaking a foreign language, a Taiwanese people related to the Bisaya of the Visayas, Philippines had landed on Penghu and plundered the fields planted by Chinese migrants. The Song dynasty sent soldiers after them and from that time on, Song patrols regularly visited Penghu in the spring and summer. A local official, Wang Dayou, had houses built on Penghu and stationed troops there to prevent depredations from the Bisheye. In 1225, the Book of Barbarian Nations anecdotally indicated that Penghu was attached to Jinjiang, Quanzhou Prefecture. A group of Quanzhou immigrants lived on Penghu. In November 1281, the Yuan dynasty under Emperor Shizu officially established the Penghu Patrol and Inspection Agency under the jurisdiction of Tong'an County, incorporating Penghu into China's sovereign domain, 403 years earlier than Taiwan island. Hostile tribes, and a lack of valuable trade products, meant that few outsiders visited the main island until the 16th century. During the 16th century, visits to the coast by fishermen and traders from Fujian, as well as Chinese and Japanese pirates, became more frequent.

In the 15th century, the Ming ordered the evacuation of the Penghu Islands as part of their maritime ban. When these restrictions were removed in the late 16th century, legal fishing communities, most of which hailing from Tong'an County, were re-established on the Penghu Islands. The Dutch East India Company (the VOC) attempted to establish a trading outpost on the Penghu Islands (Pescadores) in 1622, but was driven off by Ming forces.
In 1624, the VOC established a stronghold called Fort Zeelandia on the coastal islet of Tayouan, which is now part of the main island at Anping, Tainan.
When the Dutch arrived, they found southwestern Taiwan already frequented by a mostly transient Chinese population numbering close to 1,500. David Wright, a Scottish agent of the VOC who lived on the island in the 1650s, described the lowland areas of the island as being divided among 11 chiefdoms ranging in size from two settlements to 72. Some of these fell under Dutch control, including the Kingdom of Middag in the central western plains, while others remained independent. The VOC encouraged farmers to immigrate from Fujian and work the lands under Dutch control. By the 1660s, some 30,000 to 50,000 Chinese were living on the island. Most of the farmers cultivated rice for local consumption and sugar for export. Some immigrants were engaged in commercial deer hunting. Deerskins were sold to the Dutch and exported to Japan. Venison, horns and genitals were exported to China where the products were used as food or medicine.

In 1626, the Spanish Empire landed on and occupied northern Taiwan as a trading base, first at Keelung and in 1628 building Fort San Domingo at Tamsui. This colony lasted 16 years until 1642, when the last Spanish fortress fell to Dutch forces. The Dutch then marched south, subduing hundreds of villages in the western plains between their new possessions in the north and their base at Tayouan.

Following the fall of the Ming dynasty in Beijing in 1644, Koxinga (Zheng Chenggong) pledged allegiance to the Yongli Emperor of Southern Ming and attacked the Qing dynasty along the southeastern coast of China. In 1661, under increasing Qing pressure, he moved his forces from his base in Xiamen to Taiwan, expelling the Dutch in the following year. After being ousted from Taiwan, the Dutch allied with the new Qing dynasty in China against the Zheng regime in Taiwan. Following some skirmishes the Dutch retook the northern fortress at Keelung in 1664. Zheng Jing sent troops to dislodge the Dutch, but they were unsuccessful. The Dutch held out at Keelung until 1668, when aborigine resistance, and the lack of progress in retaking any other parts of the island persuaded the colonial authorities to abandon this final stronghold and withdraw from Taiwan altogether.

The Zheng regime, known as Kingdom of Tungning, is considered to be loyal to the Ming, while others argue that the regime acted as an independent ruler. However, Zheng Jing's return to China to participate in the Revolt of the Three Feudatories, a rebellion against the Qing court, ruined the regime and paved the way for the Qing invasion and occupation of Taiwan in 1683.

Qing rule (1683–1895)

Following the defeat of Koxinga's grandson by an armada led by Admiral Shi Lang in 1683, the Qing dynasty formally annexed Taiwan in May 1684, making it a prefecture of Fujian province while retaining its administrative seat (now Tainan) under Koxinga as the capital.

The Qing government generally tried to restrict migration to Taiwan throughout the duration of its administration because it believed that Taiwan could not sustain too large a population without leading to conflict. After the defeat of the Kingdom of Tungning, most of its population in Taiwan was sent back to the mainland, leaving the official population count at only 50,000: 546 inhabitants in Penghu, 30,229 in Taiwan, 8,108 aborigines, and 10,000 troops. Despite official restrictions, officials in Taiwan solicited settlers from the mainland, causing tens of thousands of annual arrivals from Fujian and Guangdong by 1711. A permit system was officially recorded in 1712 but it likely existed as early as 1684. Restrictions related to the permit system included only allowing those who had property on the mainland, family in Taiwan, and those who were not accompanied by wives or children, to enter Taiwan. Many of the male migrants married local indigenous women. Over the 18th century, restrictions on entering Taiwan were relaxed. In 1732, families were allowed to move to Taiwan, and in 1790, an office to manage cross-strait travel was established. By 1811 there were more than two million Han settlers in Taiwan and profitable sugar and rice production industries that provided exports to the mainland. In 1875, restrictions on entering Taiwan were repealed.

Three counties nominally covered the entire western plains, but actual control was restricted to a smaller area. A government permit was required for settlers to go beyond the Dajia River at the mid-point of the western plains. Qing administration expanded across the western plains area over the 18th century, however this was not due to an active colonization policy, but a reflection of continued illegal crossings and settlement. The Taiwanese indigenous peoples were categorized by the Qing administration into acculturated aborigines who had adopted Han culture to some degree and non-acculturated aborigines who had not. The Qing did little to administer or subjugate them. When Taiwan was annexed, there were 46 aboriginal villages under its control, likely inherited from the Kingdom of Tungning. During the early Qianlong period there were 93 acculturated villages and 61 non-acculturated villages that paid taxes. The number of acculturated villages remained unchanged throughout the 18th century. In response to the Zhu Yigui uprising, a settler rebellion in 1722, separation of aboriginals and settlers became official policy via 54 stelae used to mark the frontier boundary. The markings were changed four times over the latter half of the 18th century due to continued settler encroachment. Two aboriginal affairs sub-prefects, one for the north and one for the south, were appointed in 1766.

During the 200 years of Qing rule in Taiwan, the plains aborigines rarely rebelled against the government and the mountain aborigines were left to their own devices until the last 20 years of Qing rule. Most of the rebellions, of which there were more than 100 during the Qing period, were caused by Han settlers. More than a hundred rebellions, riots, and instances of civil strife occurred under the Qing administration, including the Lin Shuangwen rebellion (1786–1788). Their frequency was evoked by the common saying "every three years an uprising, every five years a rebellion" (三年一反、五年一亂), primarily in reference to the period between 1820 and 1850.

Many officials stationed in Taiwan called for an active colonization policy over the 19th century. In 1788, Taiwan Prefect Yang Tingli supported the efforts of a settler named Wu Sha in his attempt to claim land held by the Kavalan people in modern Yilan County. In 1797, Wu Sha was able to recruit settlers with financial support from the local government but was unable to officially register the land. In the early 1800s, local officials convinced the emperor to officially incorporate the area by playing up the issue of piracy if the land was left alone. In 1814, some settlers attempted to colonize central Taiwan by fabricating rights to lease aboriginal land. They were evicted by government troops two years later. Local officials continued to advocate for the colonization of the area but were ignored.

The Qing took on a more active colonization policy after 1874 when Japan invaded aboriginal territory in southern Taiwan and the Qing government was forced to pay an indemnity for them to leave. The administration of Taiwan was expanded with new prefectures, sub-prefectures, and counties. Mountain roads were constructed to make inner Taiwan more accessible. Restrictions on entering Taiwan were ended in 1875 and agencies for recruiting settlers were established on the mainland, but efforts to promote settlement ended soon after. In 1884, Keelung in northern Taiwan was occupied during the Sino-French War but the French forces failed to advance any further inland while their victory at Penghu in 1885 resulted in disease and retreat soon afterward as the war ended. Colonization efforts were renewed under Liu Mingchuan. In 1887, Taiwan's status was upgraded to a province. Taipei became a temporary capital and then the permanent capital in 1893. Liu's efforts to increase revenues on Taiwan's produce were hampered by foreign pressure not to increase levies. A land reform was implemented, increasing revenue which still fell short of expectation. Modern technologies such as electric lighting, a railway, telegraph lines, steamship service, and industrial machinery were introduced under Liu's governance, but several of these projects had mixed results. The telegraph line did not function at all times due to a difficult overland connection and the railway required an overhaul while servicing only small rolling stock with little freight load. A campaign to formally subjugate the aborigines was launched with 17,500 soldiers but ended with the loss of a third of the army after fierce resistance from the Mkgogan and Msbtunux peoples. Liu resigned in 1891 due to criticism of these costly projects.

By the end of the Qing period, the western plains were fully developed as farmland with about 2.5 million Chinese settlers. The mountainous areas were still largely autonomous under the control of aborigines. Aboriginal land loss under the Qing occurred at a relatively slow pace due to the absence of state sponsored land deprivation for the majority of Qing rule. Qing rule ended after the First Sino-Japanese War when it ceded Taiwan and the Penghu islands to Japan on 17 April 1895, according to the terms of the Treaty of Shimonoseki.

Japanese rule (1895–1945)

Following the Qing defeat in the First Sino-Japanese War (1894–1895), Taiwan, its associated islands, and the Penghu archipelago were ceded to the Empire of Japan by the Treaty of Shimonoseki, along with other concessions. Inhabitants on Taiwan and Penghu wishing to remain Qing subjects and not to become Japanese had to move to mainland China within a two-year grace period. Very few Formosans saw this as feasible. Estimates say around four to six thousand departed before the expiration of the grace period, and two to three hundred thousand followed during the subsequent disorder. On 25 May 1895, a group of pro-Qing high officials proclaimed the Republic of Formosa to resist impending Japanese rule. Japanese forces entered the capital at Tainan and quelled this resistance on 21 October 1895. About 6,000 inhabitants died in the initial fighting and some 14,000 died in the first year of Japanese rule. Another 12,000 "bandit-rebels" were killed from 1898 to 1902. Several subsequent rebellions against the Japanese (the Beipu uprising of 1907, the Tapani incident of 1915, and the Musha incident of 1930) were all unsuccessful but demonstrated opposition to Japanese colonial rule.

The colonial period was instrumental to the industrialization of the island, with its expansion of railways and other transport networks, the building of an extensive sanitation system, the establishment of a formal education system, and an end to the practice of headhunting. During this period, the human and natural resources of Taiwan were used to aid the development of Japan. The production of cash crops such as sugar greatly increased, especially since sugar cane was salable only to a few Japanese sugar mills, and large areas were therefore diverted from the production of rice, which the Formosans could market or consume themselves. By 1939, Taiwan was the seventh-greatest sugar producer in the world.

The Han and aboriginal populations were classified as second- and third-class citizens. Many prestigious government and business positions were closed to them, leaving few natives capable of taking on leadership and management roles decades later when Japan relinquished the island. After suppressing Han guerrillas in the first decade of their rule, Japanese authorities engaged in a series of bloody campaigns against the indigenous people residing in mountainous regions, culminating in the Musha Incident of 1930. Intellectuals and labourers who participated in left-wing movements within Taiwan were also arrested and massacred (e.g. Chiang Wei-shui and Masanosuke Watanabe). Around 1935, the Japanese began an island-wide assimilation project to bind the island more firmly to the Japanese Empire. Han culture was to be removed, and Chinese-language newspapers and curriculums were abolished. Taiwanese music and theater were outlawed. A national Shinto religion (國家神道) was promoted in parallel with the suppression of traditional Taiwanese beliefs through the reorganization of their temples and ancestral halls. Starting from 1940, families were also required to adopt Japanese surnames, although only 2% had done so by 1943. By 1938, 309,000 Japanese settlers were residing in Taiwan.

Burdened by Japan's upcoming war effort, the island was developed into a naval and air base while its agriculture, industry, and commerce suffered. Initial air attacks and the subsequent invasion of the Philippines were launched from Taiwan. The Imperial Japanese Navy operated heavily from Taiwanese ports, and its think tank "South Strike Group" was based at the Taihoku Imperial University in Taipei. Military bases and industrial centres, such as Kaohsiung and Keelung, became targets of heavy Allied bombings, which also destroyed many of the factories, dams, and transport facilities built by the Japanese. In October 1944, the Formosa Air Battle was fought between American carriers and Japanese forces in Taiwan. During the course of Second Sino-Japanese War and World War II, over 200,000 of Taiwanese served in the Japanese military, with over 30,000 casualties. In addition, over 2,000 women, euphemistically called "comfort women", were forced into sexual slavery for Imperial Japanese troops.

After Japan's surrender in WWII, most of Taiwan's approximately 300,000 Japanese residents were expelled and sent to Japan.

Republic of China (1945–present)

While Taiwan was still under Japanese rule, the Republic of China was founded on the mainland on 1 January 1912, following the Xinhai Revolution, which began with the Wuchang uprising on 10 October 1911, replacing the Qing dynasty and ending over two thousand years of imperial rule in China. From its founding until 1949 it was based in mainland China. Central authority waxed and waned in response to warlordism (1915–28), Japanese invasion (1937–45), and the Chinese Civil War (1927–50), with central authority strongest during the Nanjing decade (1927–37), when most of China came under the control of the Kuomintang (KMT) under an authoritarian one-party state.

In the 1943 Cairo Declaration, US, UK, and ROC representatives specified territories such as Formosa and the Pescadores to be restored by Japan to the Republic of China. Its terms were later referred to in the 1945 Potsdam Declaration, whose provisions Japan agreed to carry out in its instrument of surrender. In September 1945 following Japan's surrender in WWII, ROC forces, assisted by small American teams, prepared an amphibious lift into Taiwan to accept the surrender of the Japanese military forces there, under General Order No. 1, and take over the administration of Taiwan. On 25 October, General Rikichi Andō, governor-general of Taiwan and commander-in-chief of all Japanese forces on the island, signed the receipt and handed it over to ROC General Chen Yi to complete the official turnover. Chen proclaimed that day to be "Taiwan Retrocession Day", but the Allies, having entrusted Taiwan and the Penghu Islands to Chinese administration and military occupation, nonetheless considered them to be under Japanese sovereignty until 1952 when the Treaty of San Francisco took effect. Due to disagreements over which government (PRC or ROC) to invite, China did not attend the eventual signing of the Treaty of San Francisco, whereby Japan renounced all titles and claims to Formosa and the Pescadores without specifying to whom they were surrendered. In 1952, Japan and the ROC signed the Treaty of Taipei, recognizing that all treaties concluded before 9 December 1941 between China and Japan have become null and void. Interpretations of these documents and their legal implications give rise to the debate over the sovereignty status of Taiwan.

While initially enthusiastic about the return of Chinese administration and the Three Principles of the People, Formosans grew increasingly dissatisfied about being excluded from higher positions, the postponement of local elections even after the enactment of a constitution on the mainland, the smuggling of valuables off the island, the expropriation of businesses into government operated monopolies, and the hyperinflation of 1945–1949. The shooting of a civilian on 28 February 1947 triggered island-wide unrest, which was suppressed by Chen with military force in what is now called the February 28 Incident. Mainstream estimates of the number killed range from 18,000 to 30,000. Many native leaders were killed, as well as students and some mainlanders. Chen was later relieved and replaced by Wei Tao-ming, who made an effort to undo previous mismanagement by re-appointing a good proportion of islanders and re-privatizing businesses.

After the end of World War II, the Chinese Civil War resumed between the Chinese Nationalists (Kuomintang), led by Generalissimo Chiang Kai-shek, and the Chinese Communist Party (CCP), led by CCP Chairman Mao Zedong. Throughout the months of 1949, a series of Chinese Communist offensives led to the capture of its capital Nanjing on 23 April and the subsequent defeat of the Nationalist army on the mainland, and the Communists founded the People's Republic of China on 1 October.

On 7 December 1949, after the loss of four capitals, Chiang evacuated his Nationalist government to Taiwan and made Taipei the temporary capital of the ROC (also called the "wartime capital" by Chiang Kai-shek). Some 2 million people, consisting mainly of soldiers, members of the ruling Kuomintang and intellectual and business elites, were evacuated from mainland China to Taiwan at that time, adding to the earlier population of approximately six million. These people came to be known in Taiwan as "waisheng ren", residents who came to the island in the 1940s and 50s after Japan's surrender, as well as their descendants. In addition, the ROC government took to Taipei many national treasures and much of China's gold and foreign currency reserves. Most of the 3.57 million ounces of gold brought to Taiwan was used to pay soldiers' salaries. 800,000 ounces of the remaining gold was used to issue the New Taiwan dollar, part of a price stabilization program to slow the inflation in Taiwan.

After losing control of mainland China in 1949, the ROC retained control of Taiwan and Penghu (Taiwan, ROC), parts of Fujian (Fujian, ROC)—specifically Kinmen, Wuqiu (now part of Kinmen) and the Matsu Islands and two major islands in the South China Sea (within the Dongsha/Pratas and Nansha/Spratly island groups). These territories have remained under ROC governance until the present day. The ROC also briefly retained control of the entirety of Hainan (an island province), parts of Zhejiang (Chekiang)—specifically the Dachen Islands and Yijiangshan Islands—and portions of Tibet, Qinghai, Sinkiang and Yunnan. The Communists captured Hainan in 1950, captured the Dachen Islands and Yijiangshan Islands during the First Taiwan Strait Crisis in 1955 and defeated the ROC revolts in Northwest China in 1958. ROC forces in Yunnan province entered Burma and Thailand in the 1950s and were defeated by Communists in 1961. Ever since losing control of mainland China, the Kuomintang continued to claim sovereignty over 'all of China', which it defined to include mainland China (including Tibet), Taiwan (including Penghu), Outer Mongolia, and other minor territories.

Martial law era (1949–1987)

Martial law, declared on Taiwan in May 1949, continued to be in effect after the central government relocated to Taiwan. It was also used as a way to suppress the political opposition and was not repealed until 38 years later in 1987. During the White Terror, as the period is known, 140,000 people were imprisoned or executed for being perceived as anti-KMT or pro-Communist. Many citizens were arrested, tortured, imprisoned and executed for their real or perceived link to the Chinese Communist Party. Since these people were mainly from the intellectual and social elite, an entire generation of political and social leaders was decimated.

Combat between both sides of the Chinese Civil War continued through the 1950s. Following the eruption of the Korean war, US President Harry S. Truman decided to intervene in the context of the Cold War and dispatched the United States Seventh Fleet into the Taiwan Strait to prevent hostilities between the ROC on Taiwan and the PRC on the mainland. The United States also passed legislations such as the Sino-American Mutual Defense Treaty and the Formosa Resolution of 1955, thereby granting substantial foreign aid to the KMT regime between 1951 and 1965. The US foreign aid fully stabilized prices in Taiwan by 1952. The KMT government instituted many laws and land reforms that it had never effectively enacted on mainland China. Economic development was encouraged by American aid and programs such as the Joint Commission on Rural Reconstruction, which turned the agricultural sector into the basis for later growth. Under the combined stimulus of the land reform and the agricultural development programs, agricultural production increased at an average annual rate of 4 percent from 1952 to 1959, which was greater than the population growth, 3.6 percent. The government also implemented a policy of import substitution industrialization, attempting to produce imported goods domestically. The policy promoted the development of textile, food, and other labor-intensive industries in the 1950s and continued into the next decade.

As the Chinese Civil War continued without truce, the government built up military fortifications throughout Taiwan. Within this effort, veterans built the now famous Central Cross-Island Highway through the Taroko Gorge in the 1950s. During the Second Taiwan Strait Crisis in 1958, Taiwan's landscape saw Nike Hercules missiles added, with the formation of missile batteries throughout the island. The two sides would continue to engage in sporadic military clashes with seldom publicized details well into the 1960s on the China coastal islands with an unknown number of night raids.

During the 1960s and 1970s, the ROC maintained an authoritarian, single-party government under the Kuomintang's Dang Guo system while its economy became industrialized and technology-oriented. This rapid economic growth, known as the Taiwan Miracle, occurred following a strategy of prioritizing agriculture, light industries, and heavy industries in that order. Export-oriented industrialization was achieved by tax rebate for exports, removal of import restriction, moving from multiple exchange rate to single exchange rate system, and depreciation of the New Taiwan dollar. Infrastructure projects such as the Sun Yat-sen Freeway, Taoyuan International Airport, Taichung Harbor, and Jinshan Nuclear Power Plant were launched, while the rise of steel, petrochemical, and shipbuilding industries in southern Taiwan saw the transformation of Kaohsiung into a special municipality on par with Taipei. In the 1970s, Taiwan became the second fastest growing economy in Asia after Japan. Real growth in GDP averaged over 10 percent during the decade. In 1978, the combination of tax incentives and a cheap, well-trained labor force attracted investments of over $1.9 billion from overseas Chinese, the United States, and Japan, especially in the manufacturing of electrical and electronic products. By 1980, foreign trade reached $39 billion per year and generated a surplus of $46.5 million, while the income ratio of the highest to the lowest 20 percent of wage earners dropped from 15:1 to 4:1 between 1952 and 1978, less than even that of the United States. Along with Hong Kong, Singapore, and South Korea, Taiwan became known as one of the Four Asian Tigers.

Because of the Cold War, most Western nations and the United Nations regarded the ROC as the sole legitimate government of China until the 1970s. Eventually, especially after the expulsion in the United Nations, most nations switched diplomatic recognition to the PRC. Until the 1970s, the ROC government was regarded by Western critics as undemocratic for upholding martial law, severely repressing any political opposition, and controlling the media. The KMT did not allow the creation of new parties and those that existed did not seriously compete with the KMT. Thus, competitive democratic elections did not exist.

From the late 1970s to the 1990s, Taiwan went through reforms and social changes that transformed it from an authoritarian state to a democracy. Chiang Ching-kuo, Chiang Kai-shek's son, served as premier since 1972 and rose to the presidency in 1978. He sought to move more authority to "bensheng ren" (residents of Taiwan before Japan's surrender in World War II and their descendants) instead of continuing to promote "waisheng ren" (residents who came to the island in the 1940s and 50s after Japan's surrender and their descendants) as his father had. Pro-democracy activists Tangwai, literally "outside the party", emerged as the opposition. In 1979, a protest known as the Kaohsiung Incident took place in Kaohsiung to celebrate Human Rights Day. Although the protest was rapidly crushed by the authorities, it is today considered as the main event that united Taiwan's opposition.

In 1984, Chiang Ching-kuo selected Lee Teng-hui, a Taiwan-born, US-educated technocrat, to be his vice-president. After the Democratic Progressive Party (DPP) was founded as the first opposition party in Taiwan to counter the KMT in 1986, Chiang announced that he would allow the formation of new parties and intended to lift martial law. On 15 July 1987, Chiang lifted martial law on the main island of Taiwan (martial law was lifted on Kinmen and Matsu later in 1992).

Transition to democracy

After the death of Chiang Ching-kuo in 1988, Lee Teng-hui succeeded him and became the first president born in Taiwan. Lee gained control of the KMT and was elected for a full six-year term by the National Assembly in 1990 while a student movement called for democratic reforms. The movement called for items such as the dissolution of the National Assembly, which was composed of the first congress members elected mostly in mainland China during 1947 and had held the seats without re-election for more than four decades. In response to the students' protest, Lee promised to hold a National Affairs Conference on constitutional reform and institutional democratization. The Constitution Court also handed down its constitutional interpretation, saying that the first congress members who had not been re-elected should cease exercising their powers by the end of 1991. The interpretation helped pave the way for re-elections of the congress, including the National Assembly and the Legislative Yuan.

In 1991, the National Assembly resolved to abolish the Temporary Provisions against the Communist Rebellion and introduced the Additional Articles of the Constitution. Seats of the congress were re-allocated to be elected in the Taiwan Area. The nominal representation of mainland China in the congress was ultimately brought to an end in 1992. With reforms continued in the 1990s, more positions were decided by elections. In 1996, Lee Teng-hui was re-elected in the first direct presidential election.

Under Lee, the Constitution of the ROC was passed from former "constitution of five powers" to be more tripartite. Government of Taiwan Province was streamlined and provincial-level elections were suspended. Taiwan underwent a process of localization in which Taiwanese culture and history were promoted over a pan-China viewpoint in contrast to earlier KMT policies. Assimilationist language policy was replaced with support for multiculturalism and official respect for aboriginal languages and other minorities. With democratization, the issue of the political status of Taiwan gradually resurfaced as a controversial issue where, previously, the discussion of anything other than unification under the ROC was a taboo. During the years of Lee's administration, Lee and the KMT were involved in corruption controversies known as "black gold" politics. The corruption and split of the KMT were considered as factors that contributed to the party's loss in the 2000 presidential election.

Chen Shui-bian of the DPP was elected as the first non-KMT president in 2000. However, Chen lacked legistlative majority. The opposition KMT developed the Pan-Blue Coalition with other parties, mustering a slim majority over the ruling DPP-led Pan-Green Coalition in the Legislative Yuan. Polarized politics emerged in Taiwan with the Pan-Blue preference for eventual Chinese unification, while the Pan-Green prefers Taiwanese independence.

Chen announced in his inauguration speech that he would not declare independence as long as the PRC had no intention to use military force. After a recession in 2001, Chen's reference to the existence of "One Country on Each Side" of the Taiwan Strait undercut cross-Strait relations in 2002. He pushed for the first national referendum on cross-Strait relations before he was re-elected by a narrow margin of 0.22 percent in 2004, and called for an end to the National Unification Council in 2006. State-run companies began changing their names, dropping "China" references and including "Taiwan" in their official titles. The ruling DPP also passed a resolution supporting a separate identity from China and the enactment of a new constitution for a "normal country". In 2008, referendums were held on the same day as the presidential election asking whether Taiwan should join the UN. In the process, Chen alienated moderate constituents who supported the status quo and those with cross-strait economic ties, as well as creating tension with the mainland and disagreements with the United States. Chen's administration was also dogged by public concerns over reduced economic growth, legislative gridlock due to a pan-blue, opposition-controlled Legislative Yuan, and corruption investigations involving the First Family as well as government officials, lowering his ratings to the 20s near the end of his second term.

In the 2008 legislative elections, the KMT's majority in the Legislative Yuan increased. Its nominee Ma Ying-jeou went on to win the presidency, campaigning on a platform of increased economic growth and better ties with the PRC under a policy of "mutual non-denial". Under Ma, Taiwan and China opened up direct flights and cargo shipments. The PRC government even made it possible for Taiwan to participate in the annual World Health Assembly. Ma also made an official apology for the White Terror; a foundation to compensate the victims had been established by law in 1998 and over 20,000 people were compensated until it's cessation in 2014. However, closer economic ties with China raised concerns about its political consequences. In 2014, a group of university students successfully occupied the Legislative Yuan and prevented the ratification of the Cross-Strait Service Trade Agreement in what became known as the Sunflower Student Movement. The movement gave rise to youth-based third parties such as the New Power Party, and is viewed to have contributed to the DPP's victories in the 2016 presidential and legislative elections. This marked the first time in Taiwanese history that the DPP captured its legislative majority.

In 2016, Tsai Ing-wen of the DPP became the president. She called on the international community to defend democracy in the face of renewed threats from China and called on the latter to democratize and renounce the use of military force against Taiwan. In 2020, Tsai was re-elected and the ruling DPP won a majority in the simultaneous legislative election. In 2020, the Economist Intelligence Unit's Democracy Index ranked Taiwan as having the 11th highest democracy score, which was the highest in Asia, while the same Index in 2022 gave it the second highest score in the Asia and Australasia region. Freedom House has ranked Taiwan the second freest place in Asia while CIVICUS in 2021 rated Taiwan along with New Zealand as the only "open" countries in the Asia-Pacific.

Geography

The East China Sea lies to its north, the Philippine Sea to its east, the Luzon Strait directly to its south and the South China Sea to its southwest. Smaller islands include the Penghu Islands in the Taiwan Strait, the Kinmen, Matsu and Wuqiu islands near the Chinese coast, and some of the South China Sea islands.

The main island is a tilted fault block, characterized by the contrast between the eastern two-thirds, consisting mostly of five rugged mountain ranges parallel to the east coast, and the flat to gently rolling plains of the western third, where the majority of Taiwan's population reside. The tectonic boundary that formed these ranges is still active, and the island experiences many earthquakes, a few of them highly destructive. There are also many active submarine volcanoes in the Taiwan Strait.

Taiwan contains four terrestrial ecoregions: Jian Nan subtropical evergreen forests, South China Sea Islands, South Taiwan monsoon rain forests, and Taiwan subtropical evergreen forests. The eastern mountains are heavily forested and home to a diverse range of wildlife, while land use in the western and northern lowlands is intensive. The country had a 2019 Forest Landscape Integrity Index mean score of 6.38/10, ranking it 76th globally out of 172 countries.

Climate

Taiwan lies on the Tropic of Cancer, and its general climate is marine tropical. The northern and central regions are subtropical, whereas the south is tropical and the mountainous regions are temperate. The entire island experiences hot, humid weather from June through September. Typhoons are most common in July, August and September. During the winter (November to March), the northeast experiences steady rain, while the central and southern parts of the island are mostly sunny.

Due to climate change, the average temperature in Taiwan has risen  in the last 100 years, which is twice the worldwide temperature rise. The goal of the Taiwanese government is to cut carbon emissions by 20 per cent in 2030 compared to 2005 levels, and by 50 per cent in 2050 compared to 2005 levels. Carbon emissions increased by 0.92 per cent between 2005 and 2016.

Geology

The island of Taiwan lies in a complex tectonic area between the Yangtze Plate to the west and north, the Okinawa Plate on the north-east, and the Philippine Mobile Belt on the east and south. The upper part of the crust on the island is primarily made up of a series of terranes, mostly old island arcs which have been forced together by the collision of the forerunners of the Eurasian Plate and the Philippine Sea Plate. These have been further uplifted as a result of the detachment of a portion of the Eurasian Plate as it was subducted beneath remnants of the Philippine Sea Plate, a process which left the crust under Taiwan more buoyant.

The east and south of Taiwan are a complex system of belts formed by, and part of the zone of, active collision between the North Luzon Trough portion of the Luzon Volcanic Arc and South China, where accreted portions of the Luzon Arc and Luzon forearc form the eastern Coastal Range and parallel inland Longitudinal Valley of Taiwan, respectively.

The major seismic faults in Taiwan correspond to the various suture zones between the various terranes. These have produced major quakes throughout the history of the island. On 21 September 1999, a 7.3 quake known as the "921 earthquake" killed more than 2,400 people. The seismic hazard map for Taiwan by the USGS shows 9/10 of the island at the highest rating (most hazardous).

Political and legal status

The political and legal statuses of Taiwan are contentious issues. The People's Republic of China (PRC) claims that Taiwan is Chinese territory and that the PRC replaced the ROC government in 1949, becoming the sole legal government of China. The ROC, however, has its own currency, widely accepted passport, postage stamps, internet TLD, armed forces and constitution with an independently elected president. It has not formally renounced its claim to the mainland, but ROC government publications have increasingly downplayed this historical claim.

Though it was a founding member of United Nations, the ROC now has neither official membership nor observer status in the organization.

Relations with the PRC

The Mainland Affairs Council (MAC) of Taiwan is responsible for relations with the PRC, while the Taiwan Affairs Office (TAO) of the PRC is responsible for relations with Taiwan. Exchanges are conducted through private organizations both founded in 1991: the Straits Exchange Foundation (SEF) of Taiwan and the Association for Relations Across the Taiwan Straits (ARATS) of the PRC.

The political environment is complicated by the potential for military conflict should events outlined in the PRC's anti-secession law occur, such as Taiwan declaring de jure independence. The PRC suggested the "one country, two systems" employed in Hong Kong as a model for peaceful unification with Taiwan. While it aims for "peaceful reunification," the PRC does not rule out the use of force. There is a substantial military presence on the Fujian coast as well as PRC sorties into Taiwan's ADIZ. The PRC's One-China principle states that Taiwan and mainland China are both part of China, and that the PRC is the only legitimate government of China. It seeks to prevent or reduce any formal recognition of the ROC as an independent sovereign state, meaning that Taiwan participates in many international forums as a non-state member under names such as "Chinese Taipei".

In November 1992, the ARATS and SEF held a meeting which would later become known as the 1992 Consensus. The SEF announced that both sides agreed that there was only one China, but disagreed on the definition of China (i.e. the ROC vs. PRC), while the ARATS announced that the two agreed on the One China Principle, but did not mention differences regarding its definition made in the SEF statement. This discrepancy between the two statements was criticized by the DPP and former president Lee Teng-hui. The PRC has since viewed it as a prerequisite for dialogue between the ROC and PRC.

President Chen Shui-bian of the DPP, elected in March 2000, initially indicated a willingness to accept the 1992 Consensus, but later backed down due to pressure within his party and sought a middle ground by attempting dialogue with the PRC on the basis of the 1992 Consensus without explicitly accepting the One China Principle; this was not well received by the PRC and official dialogue was suspended. On 29 April 2005, Kuomintang Chairman Lien Chan travelled to Beijing and met with Chinese Communist Party General Secretary Hu Jintao, the first meeting between the leaders of the two parties since the end of the Chinese Civil War in 1949. According to US sources, Hu said in 2008 that talks between Taiwan and the mainland should be restored on the basis of the 1992 Consensus.

Ma Ying-jeou of the KMT fully endorsed the 1992 Consensus, though he stated that there would be neither unification nor declaration of independence during his presidency. After becoming elected president in 2008, talks between the ROC and PRC resumed. Direct weekend charter flights between Taiwan and mainland China began in July 2008, and the first direct daily charter flights took off in December 2008. On 11 February 2014, Mainland Affairs Council head Wang Yu-chi travelled to Nanjing and met with Taiwan Affairs Office head Zhang Zhijun, the first meeting between high-ranking officials from either side. Zhang paid a reciprocal visit to Taiwan and met Wang on 25 June 2014, making Zhang the first minister-level PRC official to ever visit Taiwan. On 7 November 2015, Ma Ying-jeou and Xi Jinping had a face-to-face meeting in Singapore, the first time two ROC and PRC leaders had met since 1949.

During the 2016 Taiwanese presidential election, Tsai Ing-wen of the DPP initially pursued a similar strategy as Chen Shui-bian, but after winning the election she received a similarly frosty reception from the PRC. In 2019, Tsai, who supported the 2019–20 Hong Kong protests, pledged that as long as she is Taiwan's president, she will never accept "one country, two systems", and that since the PRC equated the 1992 Consensus with "one country, two systems", she could not accept the 1992 Consensus as well.

Foreign relations

Before 1928, the foreign policy of Republican China was complicated by a lack of internal unity—competing centres of power all claimed legitimacy. This situation changed after the defeat of the Peiyang Government by the Kuomintang (KMT), which led to widespread diplomatic recognition of the Republic of China.

After the KMT's retreat to Taiwan, most countries, notably the countries in the Western Bloc, continued to maintain relations with the ROC, but recognition gradually eroded and many countries switched recognition to the People's Republic of China in the 1970s. On 25 October 1971, UN Resolution 2758 was adopted by 76 votes to 35 with 17 abstentions, recognizing the PRC, founded in 1949 on the mainland, as China's sole representative in the United Nations; countries in support included France, India, the UK, and the USSR, and countries in opposition included Japan and the United States.

The PRC refuses to have diplomatic relations with any nation that has diplomatic relations with the ROC, and requires all nations with which it has diplomatic relations to make a statement recognizing its claims to Taiwan. As a result, only  and the Holy See maintain official diplomatic relations with the Republic of China. The ROC maintains unofficial relations with most countries via de facto embassies and consulates called Taipei Economic and Cultural Representative Offices (TECRO), with branch offices called "Taipei Economic and Cultural Offices" (TECO). Both TECRO and TECO are "unofficial commercial entities" of the ROC in charge of maintaining diplomatic relations, providing consular services (i.e. visa applications), and serving the national interests of the ROC in other countries.

From 1954 to 1979, the United States was a partner with Taiwan in a mutual defense treaty. The United States remains one of the main supporters of Taiwan and, through the Taiwan Relations Act passed in 1979, has continued selling arms and providing military training to the Armed Forces. This situation continues to be an issue for the People's Republic of China, which considers US involvement disruptive to the stability of the region. The official position of the United States is that the PRC is expected to "use no force or threat[en] to use force against Taiwan" and the ROC is to "exercise prudence in managing all aspects of Cross-Strait relations." Both are to refrain from performing actions or espousing statements "that would unilaterally alter Taiwan's status".

Taiwan, since 2016 under the Tsai administration's New Southbound Policy, has pursued closer economic relations with South and Southeast Asian countries, increasing cooperation on investments and people-to-people exchanges despite the region's general lack of official diplomatic ties with Taipei. The policy has led to Taiwan receiving an increased number of migrants and students from the region. However, a few scandals of Southeast Asians, particularly Indonesians, experiencing exploitation in scholarship programs and in some labour industries have emerged as setbacks for the policy as well as for Indonesia-Taiwan relations.

Participation in international events and organizations

The ROC was a founding member of the United Nations, and held the seat of China on the Security Council and other UN bodies until 1971, when it was expelled by Resolution 2758 and replaced in all UN organs with the PRC. Since 1993, the ROC has petitioned the UN for entry, but its applications have not made it past committee stage. Due to the One China policy, most UN member states, including the United States, do not wish to discuss the issue of the ROC's political status for fear of souring diplomatic ties with the PRC.

The ROC government shifted its focus to organizations affiliated with the UN, as well as organizations outside the UN system. The government sought to participate in the World Health Organization (WHO) since 1997, their efforts were rejected until 2009, when they participated as an observer under the name "Chinese Taipei" after reaching an agreement with Beijing. In 2017, Taiwan again began to be excluded from the WHO even in an observer capacity. This exclusion caused a number of scandals during the COVID-19 outbreak.

The Nagoya Resolution in 1979 approved by the International Olympic Committee (IOC) provided a compromise for the ROC to use the name "Chinese Taipei" in international events where the PRC is also a party, such as the Olympic Games. Under the IOC charter, ROC flags cannot be flown at any official Olympic venue or gathering. The ROC also participates in the Asia-Pacific Economic Cooperation forum (since 1991) and the World Trade Organization (since 2002) under the names "Chinese Taipei" and "Separate Customs Territory of Taiwan, Penghu, Kinmen and Matsu", respectively. It was a founding member of the Asian Development Bank, but since China's ascension in 1986 has participated under the name "Taipei, China". The ROC is able to participate as "China" in organizations in which the PRC does not participate, such as the World Organization of the Scout Movement.

Due to its limited international recognition, the Republic of China has been a member of the Unrepresented Nations and Peoples Organization (UNPO) since the foundation of the organization in 1991, represented by a government-funded organization, the Taiwan Foundation for Democracy (TFD), under the name "Taiwan".

Domestic opinion

Broadly speaking, domestic public opinion has preferred maintaining the status quo, though pro-independence sentiment has steadily risen since 1994. In June 2021, an annual poll run by the National Chengchi University found that 28.2 percent of respondents supported the status quo and postponing a decision, 27.5 percent supported maintaining the status quo indefinitely, 25.8 percent supported the status quo with a move toward independence, 5.9 percent supported the status quo with a move toward unification, 5.7 percent gave no response, 5.6 percent supported independence as soon as possible, and 1.5 percent supported unification as soon as possible. A referendum question in 2018 asked if Taiwan's athletes should compete under "Taiwan" in the 2020 Summer Olympics but did not pass; the New York Times attributed the failure to a campaign cautioning that a name change might lead to Taiwan being banned "under Chinese pressure".

The KMT, the largest Pan-Blue party, supports the status quo for the indefinite future with a stated ultimate goal of unification. However, it does not support unification in the short term with the PRC as such a prospect would be unacceptable to most of its members and the public. Ma Ying-jeou, chairman of the KMT and former president of the ROC, has set out democracy, economic development to a level near that of Taiwan, and equitable wealth distribution as the conditions that the PRC must fulfill for unification to occur. Ma stated that the cross-Strait relations are neither between two Chinas nor two states. It is a special relationship. Further, he stated that the sovereignty issues between the two cannot be resolved at present.

The Democratic Progressive Party, the largest Pan-Green party, officially seeks independence, but in practice also supports the status quo because neither independence nor unification seems likely in the short or even medium term. In 2017, Taiwanese premier William Lai of the Democratic Progressive Party said that he was a "political worker who advocates Taiwan independence", but that as Taiwan was already an independent country called the Republic of China, it had no need to declare independence.

Government and politics

Government 

The government of the Republic of China was founded on the 1947 Constitution of the ROC and its Three Principles of the People, which states that the ROC "shall be a democratic republic of the people, to be governed by the people and for the people". It underwent significant revisions in the 1990s, known collectively as the Additional Articles. The government is divided into five branches (Yuan): the Executive Yuan (cabinet), the Legislative Yuan (Congress or Parliament), the Judicial Yuan, the Control Yuan (audit agency), and the Examination Yuan (civil service examination agency).

The head of state and commander-in-chief of the armed forces is the president, who is elected by popular vote for a maximum of 2 four-year terms on the same ticket as the vice-president. The president appoints the members of the Executive Yuan as their cabinet, including a premier, who is officially the President of the Executive Yuan; members are responsible for policy and administration.

The main legislative body is the unicameral Legislative Yuan with 113 seats. Seventy-three are elected by popular vote from single-member constituencies; thirty-four are elected based on the proportion of nationwide votes received by participating political parties in a separate party list ballot; and six are elected from two three-member aboriginal constituencies. Members serve four-year terms. Originally the unicameral National Assembly, as a standing constitutional convention and electoral college, held some parliamentary functions, but the National Assembly was abolished in 2005 with the power of constitutional amendments handed over to the Legislative Yuan and all eligible voters of the Republic via referendums.

The premier is selected by the president without the need for approval from the legislature, but the legislature can pass laws without regard for the president, as neither he nor the Premier wields veto power. Thus, there is little incentive for the president and the legislature to negotiate on legislation if they are of opposing parties. After the election of the pan-Green's Chen Shui-bian as president in 2000, legislation repeatedly stalled because of deadlock with the Legislative Yuan, which was controlled by a pan-Blue majority. Historically, the ROC has been dominated by strongman single party politics. This legacy has resulted in executive powers currently being concentrated in the office of the president rather than the premier, even though the constitution does not explicitly state the extent of the president's executive power.

The Judicial Yuan is the highest judicial organ. It interprets the constitution and other laws and decrees, judges administrative suits, and disciplines public functionaries. The president and vice-president of the Judicial Yuan and additional thirteen justices form the Council of Grand Justices. They are nominated and appointed by the president, with the consent of the Legislative Yuan. The highest court, the Supreme Court, consists of a number of civil and criminal divisions, each of which is formed by a presiding judge and four associate judges, all appointed for life. In 1993, a separate constitutional court was established to resolve constitutional disputes, regulate the activities of political parties and accelerate the democratization process. There is no trial by jury but the right to a fair public trial is protected by law and respected in practice; many cases are presided over by multiple judges.

The Control Yuan is a watchdog agency that monitors (controls) the actions of the executive. It can be considered a standing commission for administrative inquiry and can be compared to the Court of Auditors of the European Union or the Government Accountability Office of the United States. It is also responsible for the National Human Rights Commission.

The Examination Yuan is in charge of validating the qualification of civil servants. It is based on the old imperial examination system used in dynastic China. It can be compared to the European Personnel Selection Office of the European Union or the Office of Personnel Management of the United States. It was downsized in 2019, and there have been calls for its abolition.

Constitution 
The constitution was drafted in by the KMT while the ROC still governed the Chinese mainland, went into effect on 25 December 1947. The ROC remained under martial law from 1948 until 1987 and much of the constitution was not in effect. Political reforms beginning in the late 1970s resulted in the end of martial law in 1987, and Taiwan transformed into a multiparty democracy in the early 1990s. The constitutional basis for this transition to democracy was gradually laid in the Additional Articles of the Constitution of the Republic of China. In addition, these articles localized the Constitution by suspending portions of the Constitution designed for the governance of mainland China and replacing them with articles adapted for the governance of and guaranteeing the political rights of residents of the Taiwan Area, as defined in the Act Governing Relations between the People of the Taiwan Area and the Mainland Area.

National boundaries were not explicitly prescribed by the 1947 Constitution, and the Constitutional Court declined to define these boundaries in a 1993 interpretation, viewing the question as a political question to be resolved by the Executive and Legislative Yuans. The 1947 Constitution included articles regarding representatives from former Qing dynasty territories including Tibet and Mongolia (though it did not specify whether this excluded Outer Mongolia). The ROC recognized Mongolia as an independent country in 1946 after signing the 1945 Sino-Soviet Treaty of Friendship and Alliance, but after retreating to Taiwan in 1949 it reneged on its agreement in order to preserve its claim over mainland China. The Additional Articles of the 1990s did not alter national boundaries, but suspended articles regarding Mongolian and Tibetan representatives. The ROC began to accept the Mongolian passport and removed clauses referring to Outer Mongolia from the Act Governing Relations between the People of the Taiwan Area and the Mainland Area in 2002. In 2012 the Mainland Affairs Council issued a statement clarifying that Outer Mongolia was not part of the ROC's national territory in 1947, and that the termination of the Sino-Soviet Treaty had not altered national territory according to the Constitution. The Mongolian and Tibetan Affairs Commission in the Executive Yuan was abolished in 2017.

Major camps

Taiwan's political scene is divided into two major camps in terms of cross-Strait relations, i.e. how Taiwan should relate to China or the PRC. The Pan-Green Coalition (e.g. the Democratic Progressive Party) leans pro-independence, and the Pan-Blue Coalition (e.g. the Kuomintang) leans pro-unification. Moderates in both camps regard the Republic of China as a sovereign independent state, but .

The Pan-Green Coalition is mainly led by the pro-independence Democratic Progressive Party (DPP), Taiwan Statebuilding Party (TSP)  and Green Party (GPT). They oppose the idea that Taiwan is part of China, and seek wide diplomatic recognition and an eventual declaration of formal Taiwan independence. In September 2007, the then ruling DPP approved a resolution asserting separate identity from China and called for the enactment of a new constitution for a "normal country". It called also for general use of "Taiwan" as the country's name, without abolishing its formal name, the "Republic of China". The name "Taiwan" has been used increasingly often after the emergence of the Taiwanese independence movement. Some members of the coalition, such as former President Chen Shui-bian, argue that it is unnecessary to proclaim independence because "Taiwan is already an independent, sovereign country" and the Republic of China is the same as Taiwan. Despite being a member of KMT prior to and during his presidency, Lee Teng-hui also held a similar view and was a supporter of the Taiwanization movement. TSP and GPT have adopted a line that aggressive route more than the DPP, in order to win over pro-independence voters who are dissatisfied with the DPP's conservative stance.

The Pan-Blue Coalition, composed of the pro-unification Kuomintang (KMT), People First Party (PFP) and New Party generally support the spirit of the 1992 Consensus, where the KMT claimed that there is one China, but that the ROC and PRC have different interpretations of what "China" means. They favour eventual unification with China. Regarding independence, the mainstream Pan-Blue position is to maintain the status quo, while refusing immediate unification. President Ma Ying-jeou stated that there will be no unification nor declaration of independence during his presidency. Some Pan-Blue members seek to improve relationships with PRC, with a focus on improving economic ties.

National identity
 
 
Roughly 84 per cent of Taiwan's population are descendants of Han Chinese immigrants from Qing China between 1683 and 1895. Another significant fraction descends from Han Chinese who immigrated from mainland China in the late 1940s and early 1950s. The shared cultural origin combined with several hundred years of geographical separation, some hundred years of political separation and foreign influences, as well as hostility between the rival ROC and PRC have resulted in national identity being a contentious issue with political overtones.

Since democratic reforms and the lifting of martial law, a distinct Taiwanese identity (as opposed to Taiwanese identity as a subset of a Chinese identity) is often at the heart of political debates. Its acceptance makes the island distinct from mainland China, and therefore may be seen as a step towards forming a consensus for de jure Taiwan independence. The Pan-Green camp supports a predominantly Taiwanese identity (although "Chinese" may be viewed as cultural heritage), while the Pan-Blue camp supports a predominantly Chinese identity (with "Taiwanese" as a regional/diasporic Chinese identity). The KMT has downplayed this stance in the recent years and now supports a Taiwanese identity as part of a Chinese identity.

In annual polls conducted by National Chengchi University, Taiwanese identification has increased substantially since the early 1990s, while Chinese identification has fallen to a low level, and identification as both has also seen a reduction. In 1992, 17.6 percent of respondents identified as Taiwanese, 25.5 percent as Chinese, 46.4 percent as both, and 10.5 percent non-response. In June 2021, 63.3 percent identified as Taiwanese, 2.6 percent as Chinese, 31.4 percent as both, and 2.7 percent non-response. A survey conducted in Taiwan by Global Views Survey Research Center in July 2009 showed that 82.8 percent of respondents consider the ROC and the PRC as two separate countries with each developing on its own but 80.2 percent think they are members of the Chinese.

Administrative divisions

According to the 1947 constitution, the territory of the ROC is according to its "existing national boundaries". The ROC is, de jure constitutionally, divided into , special municipalities (which are further divided into districts for local administration), and the province-level Tibet Area. Each province is subdivided into cities and counties, which are further divided into townships and county-administered cities, each having elected mayors and city councillors who share duties with the county. Some divisions are indigenous divisions which have different degrees of autonomy to standard ones. In addition, districts, cities and townships are further divided into villages and neighbourhoods. The provinces have been "streamlined" and are no longer functional. Similarly, banners in both Mongolia and mainland China (Inner Mongolia) also existed, but they were abolished in 2006 and the ROC reaffirmed its recognition of Mongolia in 2002, as stipulated in the 1946 constitution.

With provinces non-functional, Taiwan is, in practice, divided into 22 subnational divisions, each with a self-governing body led by an elected leader and a legislative body with elected members. Duties of local governments include social services, education, urban planning, public construction, water management, environmental protection, transport, public safety, and more.

When the ROC retreated to Taiwan in 1949, its claimed territory consisted of 35 provinces, 12 special municipalities, 1 special administrative region and 2 autonomous regions. However, since its retreat, the ROC has controlled only Taiwan Province and some islands of Fujian Province. The ROC also controls the Pratas Islands and Taiping Island in the Spratly Islands, which are part of the disputed South China Sea Islands. They were placed under Kaohsiung administration after the retreat to Taiwan.

Military

The Republic of China Army takes its roots in the National Revolutionary Army, which was established by Sun Yat-sen in 1925 in Guangdong with a goal of reunifying China under the Kuomintang. When the People's Liberation Army won the Chinese Civil War, much of the National Revolutionary Army retreated to Taiwan along with the government. It was later reformed into the Republic of China Army. Units which surrendered and remained in mainland China were either disbanded or incorporated into the People's Liberation Army.

From 1949 to the 1970s, the primary mission of the Taiwanese military was to "retake mainland China" through Project National Glory. As this mission has transitioned away from attack because the relative strength of the PRC has massively increased, the ROC military has begun to shift emphasis from the traditionally dominant Army to the air force and navy. Control of the armed forces has also passed into the hands of the civilian government.

The ROC began a series of force reduction plans since 1990s, Jingshi An (translated to streamlining program) was one of the programs to scale down its military from a level of 450,000 in 1997 to 380,000 in 2001. , the total strength of the Armed Forces is capped at 215,000 with 90 percent manning ratio for volunteer military. Conscription remains universal for qualified males reaching age eighteen, but as a part of the reduction effort many are given the opportunity to fulfill their draft requirement through alternative service and are redirected to government agencies or arms related industries. Taiwan cut compulsory military service to four months in 2013 but will extend military service to one year in 2024. The military's reservists is around 2.5 million including first-wave reservists numbered at 300,000 . Taiwan's defense spending as a percentage of its GDP fell below three percent in 1999 and had been trending downwards over the first two decades of the twenty-first century. The ROC government spent approximately two percent of GDP on defense and failed to raise the spending as high as proposed three percent of GDP. In 2022, Taiwan proposed 2.4 percent of projected GDP in defense spending for the following year, continued to remain below three percent.

The ROC and the United States signed the Sino-American Mutual Defense Treaty in 1954, and established the United States Taiwan Defense Command. About 30,000 US troops were stationed in Taiwan, until the United States established diplomatic relations with the PRC in 1979. A significant amount of military hardware has been bought from the United States, and continues to be legally guaranteed by the Taiwan Relations Act. In the past, France and the Netherlands have also sold military weapons and hardware to the ROC, but they almost entirely stopped in the 1990s under pressure of the PRC.

There is no guarantee in the Taiwan Relations Act or any other treaty that the United States will defend Taiwan, even in the event of invasion. On several occasions in 2021 and 2022, U.S. President Joe Biden stated that the United States will intervene if the PRC attempts to invade Taiwan. However, when asked about the answer, the White House officials insisted that US policy on Taiwan has not changed. The joint declaration on security between the US and Japan signed in 1996 may imply that Japan would be involved in any response. However, Japan has refused to stipulate whether the "area surrounding Japan" mentioned in the pact includes Taiwan, and the precise purpose of the pact is unclear. The Australia, New Zealand, United States Security Treaty (ANZUS Treaty) may mean that other US allies, such as Australia, could theoretically be involved. While this would risk damaging economic ties with China, a conflict over Taiwan could lead to an economic blockade of China by a greater coalition.

Economy

The quick industrialization and rapid growth of Taiwan during the latter half of the 20th century has been called the "Taiwan Miracle". Taiwan is one of the "Four Asian Tigers" alongside Hong Kong, South Korea and Singapore. As of October 2022, Taiwan is the 21st largest economy in the world by nominal GDP.

Since 2001, agriculture constituted less than 2 per cent of GDP, down from 32 per cent in 1951. Unlike its neighbours, South Korea and Japan, the Taiwanese economy is dominated by small and medium-sized enterprises, rather than the large business groups. Traditional labour-intensive industries are steadily being moved offshore and with more capital and technology-intensive industries replacing them. High-technology science parks have sprung up in Taiwan.

Today Taiwan has a dynamic, capitalist, export-driven economy with gradually decreasing state involvement in investment and foreign trade. In keeping with this trend, some large government-owned banks and industrial firms are being privatized. Exports have provided the primary impetus for industrialization. The trade surplus is substantial, and Taiwan remained one of the world's largest forex reserve holders. Taiwan's total trade in 2022 reached US$907 billion, according to Taiwan's Ministry of Finance. Both exports and imports for the year reached record levels, totaling US$479.52 billion and US$427.60 billion, respectively. China, United States and Japan are Taiwan's top 3 largest trading partners, accounting for over 40 per cent of Taiwan's total trade.

Since the beginning of the 1990s, the economic ties between Taiwan and China have been extensive. In 2002, China's share surpassed the United States to become Taiwan's largest export market for the first time. China is also the most important target of Taiwan's outward foreign direct investment. From 1991 to 2022, more than US$200 billion have been invested in China by Taiwanese companies. China hosts around 4,200 Taiwanese enterprises and over 240,000 Taiwanese work in China. Although the economy of Taiwan benefits from this situation, some have expressed the view that the island has become increasingly dependent on the mainland Chinese economy. A 2008 white paper by the Department of Industrial Technology states that "Taiwan should seek to maintain stable relation with China while continuing to protect national security, and avoiding excessive 'Sinicization' of Taiwanese economy." Others argue that close economic ties between Taiwan and mainland China would make any military intervention by the PLA against Taiwan very costly, and therefore less probable.

High-tech manufacturing 
Since the 1980s, a number of Taiwan-based technology firms have expanded their reach around the world. Computex, a trade fair held annually in Taipei, has rapidly expanded and become an important showcase for the ICT industry globally.

Taiwan is a key player in the supply chain for advanced chips. Taiwan's rise in the key semiconductor industry was largely attributed to Taiwan Semiconductor Manufacturing Co. (TSMC) and United Microelectronic Corporation (UMC). TSMC was founded 21 February 1987 and as of December 2021 its market capitalization equated to roughly 90% of Taiwan's GDP. The company is the 9th largest in the world by market capitalization as well as the world's biggest semiconductor manufacturing company, surpassing Intel and Samsung.  Its major customers include Qualcomm, Nvidia, Broadcom, Intel, AMD, Apple Inc., Ampere, Microsoft, MediaTek and Sony. In 2018, the company's N7+ node became the first commercial node to be made with EUV lithography, as well its N7 node being the first sub-10 nm node to enter volume production. TSMC was the first Taiwanese company to be listed on the New York Stock Exchange, under the trade name "TSM", in October 1997. As of Q4 2022, TSMC is responsible for 60% of the total semiconductor market making it the biggest foundry.

UMC, another major company in Taiwan's high-tech exports and global semiconductors, does not however, compete with TSMC on advance semiconductor processes. Instead it competes with the American GlobalFoundries, and others, for less advanced semiconductor processes and for silicon wafers. Its major customers include, MediaTek, Texas Instruments, and Realtek. As of Q4 2022, UMC is the 3rd biggest foundry by market share, behind Samsung, controlling 6% of the total semiconductor market.

Other well-known international technology companies headquartered in Taiwan include personal computer manufacturers Acer Inc. and Asus, as well as electronics manufacturing giant Foxconn. Foxconn is a major smart-device manufacturer, is headquartered in New Taipei City. It is also listed in the Taiwan Stock Exchange under the trade name "Hon Hai". Most of its factories are located in East Asia, with a majority of 12 factories located in China. Its major customers include Apple, Microsoft, Amazon, Google, and Huawei.

Transport

The Ministry of Transportation and Communications of the Republic of China is the cabinet-level governing body of the transport network in Taiwan.

Civilian transport in Taiwan is characterised by extensive use of scooters. In March 2019, 13.86 million were registered, twice that of cars.

Railways in Taiwan are primarily used for passenger services, with Taiwan Railways Administration (TRA) operating a circular route around the island and Taiwan High Speed Rail (THSR) running high speed services on the west coast. Urban transit systems include Taipei Metro, Kaohsiung Metro, Taoyuan Metro, New Taipei Metro, and Taichung Metro.

Major airports include Taiwan Taoyuan, Kaohsiung, Taipei Songshan and Taichung. There are currently seven airlines in Taiwan, with the largest two being China Airlines and EVA Air.

There are seven international seaports: Keelung, Taipei, Suao, Taichung, Kaohsiung, Anping, and Hualien. The Port of Kaohsiung handled the largest volume of cargo in Taiwan, with about 440 million shipping tonnes, which accounted for 58.6% of Taiwan's total throughput in 2021. The shipping tonnage followed by Taichung (18.6%), Taipei (12%) and Keelung (8.7%).

Education

Taiwan's higher education system was established by Japan during the colonial period. However, after the Republic of China took over in 1945, the system was promptly replaced by the same system as in mainland China which mixed features of the Chinese and American educational systems.

Taiwan is well known for adhering to the Confucian paradigm of valuing education as a means to improve one's socioeconomic position in society. Heavy investment and a cultural valuing of education has catapulted the resource-poor nation consistently to the top of global education rankings. Taiwan is one of the top-performing countries in reading literacy, mathematics and sciences. In 2015, Taiwanese students achieved one of the world's best results in mathematics, science and literacy, as tested by the Programme for International Student Assessment (PISA), with the average student scoring 519, compared with the OECD average of 493, placing it seventh in the world.

The Taiwanese education system has been praised for various reasons, including its comparatively high test results and its major role in promoting Taiwan's economic development while creating one of the world's most highly educated workforces. Taiwan has also been praised for its high university entrance rate where the university acceptance rate has increased from around 20 per cent before the 1980s to 49 per cent in 1996 and over 95 per cent since 2008, among the highest in Asia. The nation's high university entrance rate has created a highly skilled workforce making Taiwan one of the most highly educated countries in the world with 68.5 per cent of Taiwanese high school students going on to attend university. Taiwan has a high percentage of its citizens holding a tertiary education degree where 45 per cent of Taiwanese aged 25–64 hold a bachelor's degree or higher compared with the average of 33 per cent among member countries of the Organisation for Economic Cooperation and Development (OECD).

On the other hand, the system has been criticised for placing excessive pressure on students while eschewing creativity and producing an excess supply of over-educated university graduates and a high graduate unemployment rate. With a large number of university graduates seeking a limited number of prestigious white collar jobs in an economic environment that is increasingly losing its competitive edge, this has led many graduates to be employed in lower-end jobs with salaries far beneath their expectations. Taiwan's universities have also been under criticism for not being able to fully meet the requirements and demands of Taiwan's 21st-century fast-moving labour market, citing a skills mismatch among a large number of self-assessed, overeducated university graduates who do not fit the demands of the modern Taiwanese labour market. The Taiwanese government has also received criticism for undermining the economy as it has been unable to produce enough jobs to meet the demands of numerous underemployed university graduates.

As the Taiwanese economy is largely science and technology based, the labour market demands people who have achieved some form of higher education, particularly related to science and engineering to gain a competitive edge when searching for employment. Although current Taiwanese law mandates only nine years of schooling, 95 per cent of junior high graduates go on to attend a senior vocational high school, university, junior college, trade school, or other higher education institution.

Since Made in China 2025 was announced in 2015, aggressive campaigns to recruit Taiwanese chip industry talent to support its mandates resulted in the loss of more than 3,000 chip engineers to mainland China, and raised concerns of a "brain drain" in Taiwan.

Many Taiwanese students attend cram schools, or buxiban, to improve skills and knowledge on problem solving against exams of subjects like mathematics, nature science, history and many others. Courses are available for most popular subjects and include lectures, reviews, private tutorial sessions, and recitations.

, the literacy rate in Taiwan was 99.03 percent.

Demographics

Taiwan has a population of about 23.4 million, most of whom are on the island of Taiwan. The remainder live on the outlying islands of Penghu (101,758), Kinmen (127,723), and Matsu (12,506).

Largest cities and counties

The figures below are the March 2019 estimates for the twenty most populous administrative divisions; a different ranking exists when considering the total metropolitan area populations (in such rankings the Taipei-Keelung metro area is by far the largest agglomeration). The figures reflect the number of household registrations in each city, which may differ from the number of actual residents.

Ethnic groups

The ROC government reports that 95 per cent of the population is Han. There are also 2.4 per cent indigenous Austronesian peoples and 2.6 per cent new immigrants primarily from China and Southeast Asia.

The overwhelming majority of Han are descendants of Hoklo and Hakka who arrived in large numbers in the 17th to 18th century. A minority are waishengren, descendants of Chinese nationalists who fled to Taiwan at the end of the Chinese Civil War in 1949. The Hoklo people, whose ancestors migrated from the coastal southern Fujian region, compose approximately 70 per cent of Taiwan's population. The Hakka comprise about 15 per cent of the total population, and descend from Han migrants from eastern Guangdong. Genetic studies also indicate that the Hoklo and Hakka people that make up majority of the Taiwanese population, are a mixture between Austronesians and Han people.

The indigenous Taiwanese aborigines number about 584,000, and the government recognises 16 groups. The Ami, Atayal, Bunun, Kanakanavu, Kavalan, Paiwan, Puyuma, Rukai, Saisiyat, Saaroa, Sakizaya, Sediq, Thao, Truku and Tsou live mostly in the eastern half of the island, while the Yami inhabit Orchid Island.

Languages

Mandarin is the primary language used in business and education, and is spoken by the vast majority of the population. Traditional Chinese is used as the writing system. The Republic of China does not have any legally designated official language, but Mandarin plays the role of the de facto official language.

Around 70% of Taiwan's population belong to the Hoklo ethnic group and are speakers of Taiwanese Hokkien as native language. The Hakka group, comprising some 14–18 per cent of the population, speak Hakka. Although Mandarin is the language of instruction in schools and dominates television and radio, non-Mandarin Chinese varieties have undergone a revival in public life in Taiwan, particularly since restrictions on their use were lifted in the 1990s.

Formosan languages are spoken primarily by the indigenous peoples of Taiwan. They do not belong to the Chinese or Sino-Tibetan language family, but to the Austronesian language family, and are written in Latin alphabet. Their use among aboriginal minority groups has been in decline as usage of Mandarin has risen. Of the 14 extant languages, five are considered moribund.

Classical Chinese 
Since the May Fourth Movement, written vernacular Chinese had replaced Classical Chinese and emerged as the mainstream written Chinese in the Republic of China. But Classical Chinese continued to be widely used in the Government of the Republic of China. Most government documents in the Republic of China were written in Classical Chinese until reforms in the 1970s, in a reform movement spearheaded by President Yen Chia-kan to shift the written style to a more integrated vernacular Chinese and Classical Chinese style (文白合一行文). After 1 January 2005, the Executive Yuan also changed the long-standing official document writing habit from vertical writing style to horizontal writing style.

Today, pure Classical Chinese is occasionally used in formal or ceremonial occasions, religious or cultural rites in Taiwan. The National Anthem of the Republic of China, for example, is in Classical Chinese. Taoist texts are still preserved in Classical Chinese from the time they were composed. Buddhist texts, or sutras, are still preserved in Classical Chinese from the time they were composed or translated from Sanskrit sources. In practice there is a socially accepted continuum between vernacular Chinese and Classical Chinese. Most official government documents, legal, courts rulings and judiciary documents use a combined vernacular Chinese and Classical Chinese style (文白合一行文). For example, most official notices and formal letters are written with a number of stock Classical Chinese expressions (e.g. salutation, closing). Personal letters, on the other hand, are mostly written in vernacular, but with some Classical phrases, depending on the subject matter, the writer's level of education, etc.

As many legal documents are still written in Classical Chinese, which is not easily understood by the general public, a group of Taiwanese had launched the Legal Vernacular Movement hoping to bring more Vernacular Chinese into the legal writings of the Republic of China.

Taiwan is officially multilingual. A national language in Taiwan is legally defined as "a natural language used by an original people group of Taiwan and the Taiwan Sign Language". As of 2019, policies on national languages are in early stages of implementation, with Hakka and indigenous languages designated as such.

Religion

The Constitution of the Republic of China protects people's freedom of religion and the practices of belief. The government respects freedom of religion, and Taiwan scores highly on the International IDEA's Global State of Democracy Indices for religious freedom.

In 2005, the census reported that the five largest religions were: Buddhism, Taoism, Yiguandao, Protestantism, and Roman Catholicism. According to Pew Research, the religious composition of Taiwan in 2020 is estimated to be 43.8 per cent Folk religions, 21.2 per cent Buddhist, 15.5 Others (including Taoism), 13.7 per cent Unaffiliated, 5.8 per cent Christian and 1% Muslim. Taiwanese aborigines comprise a notable subgroup among professing Christians: "...over 64 per cent identify as Christian... Church buildings are the most obvious markers of Aboriginal villages, distinguishing them from Taiwanese or Hakka villages". There has been a small Muslim community of Hui people in Taiwan since the 17th century.

Confucianism is a philosophy that deals with secular moral ethics, and serves as the foundation of both Chinese and Taiwanese culture. The majority of Taiwanese people usually combine the secular moral teachings of Confucianism with whatever religions they are affiliated with.

, there were 15,175 religious buildings in Taiwan, approximately one place of worship per 1,572 residents. 12,279 temples were dedicated to Taoism and Buddhism. There were 9,684 Taoist Temples and 2,317 Buddhist Temples. In Taiwan's 36,000 square kilometers of land, there are more than 33,000 places for religious (believers) to worship and gather. On average, there is one temple or church (church) or religious building for every square kilometer. The high density of place of worship is rare in the world, and it is the area with the highest density of religious buildings in the Chinese-speaking world. Taiwan is also the most religious region in the Chinese-speaking world. Even for Christianity, there are 2,845 Churches.

A significant percentage of the population of Taiwan is non-religious. Taiwan's lack of state-sanctioned discrimination, and generally high regard for freedom of religion or belief earned it a joint #1 ranking in the 2018 Freedom of Thought Report, alongside the Netherlands and Belgium. On the other hand, there have been instances of the Indonesian migrant worker community in Taiwan (estimated to total 258,084 people) experiencing religious restrictions by local employers or the government.

LGBT rights

On 24 May 2017, the Constitutional Court ruled that then-current marriage laws had been violating the Constitution by denying Taiwanese same-sex couples the right to marry. The Court ruled that if the Legislative Yuan did not pass adequate amendments to Taiwanese marriage laws within two years, same-sex marriages would automatically become lawful in Taiwan. In a referendum question in 2018, however, voters expressed overwhelming opposition to same-sex marriage and supported the removal of content about homosexuality from primary school textbooks. According to the New York Times, the aforementioned referendum questions were subject to a "well-funded and highly organized campaign led by conservative Christians and other groups" involving the use of "misinformation, the bulk of which was spread online." Nevertheless, the vote against same-sex marriage does not affect the court ruling, and on 17 May 2019, Taiwan's parliament approved a bill legalising same-sex marriage, making it the first country in Asia to do so.

Taiwan has an annual pride event, Taiwan Pride. It currently holds the record for the largest LGBT gathering in East-Asia, rivaling Tel Aviv Pride in Israel. The event draws more than 200,000 people to demonstrate for equal rights for LGBT people. The event is organized by the Taiwan LGBT Pride Community, and is held on the last Sunday of October.

Health

The current healthcare system in Taiwan, known as National Health Insurance (NHI), was instituted in 1995. NHI is a single-payer compulsory social insurance plan that centralizes the disbursement of healthcare funds. The system promises equal access to healthcare for all citizens, and the population coverage had reached 99 per cent by the end of 2004. NHI is mainly financed through premiums, which are based on the payroll tax, and is supplemented with out-of-pocket co-payments and direct government funding. Low-income families, veterans, centenarians, children under three years old, and catastrophic diseases are exempt from co-payments. Co-pays are reduced for disabled and low income households maintain 100 percent premium coverage by the NHI.

Early in the program, the payment system was predominantly fee-for-service. Most health providers operate in the private sector and form a competitive market on the health delivery side. However, many healthcare providers took advantage of the system by offering unnecessary services to a larger number of patients and then billing the government. In the face of increasing loss and the need for cost containment, NHI changed the payment system from fee-for-service to a global budget, a kind of prospective payment system, in 2002.

The implementation of universal healthcare created fewer health disparities for lower-income citizens in Taiwan. According to a recently published survey, out of 3,360 patients surveyed at a randomly chosen hospital, 75.1 per cent of the patients said they are "very satisfied" with the hospital service; 20.5 per cent said they are "okay" with the service. Only 4.4 per cent of the patients said they are either "not satisfied" or "very not satisfied" with the service or care provided.

The Taiwanese disease control authority is the Taiwan Centers for Disease Control (CDC), and during the SARS outbreak in March 2003 there were 347 confirmed cases. During the outbreak the CDC and local governments set up monitoring stations throughout public transportation, recreational sites and other public areas. With full containment in July 2003, there has not been a case of SARS since. The CECC has since played a central role in Taiwan's approach to epidemics, including the COVID-19 pandemic.

In 2019, the infant mortality rate was 4.2 deaths per 1,000 live births, with 20 physicians and 71 hospital beds per 10,000 people. Life expectancy at birth in 2020 is 77.5 years and 83.9 years for males and females, respectively.

Culture

The cultures of Taiwan are a hybrid blend from various sources, incorporating elements of the majority traditional Chinese culture, aboriginal cultures, Japanese cultural influence, traditional Confucianist beliefs, and increasingly, Western values.

During the martial law period in which the Republic of China was officially anti-communist, the Kuomintang promoted an official traditional Chinese culture over Taiwan in order to emphasize that the Republic of China represents the true orthodoxy to Chinese Culture (and therefore the "real and legitimate China") as opposed to Communist China. The government launched what's known as the Chinese Cultural Renaissance movement in Taiwan in opposition to the cultural destructions caused by the Chinese Communist Party during the Cultural Revolution. The General Assembly of Chinese Culture (中華文化總會) was established as a movement promotion council to help promote Chinese Culture in Taiwan and overseas. It was Kuomintang's first structured plan for cultural development on Taiwan. Chiang himself was the head of the General Assembly of Chinese Culture. Subsequent President of the Republic of China also became the head of this General Assembly. The Chinese Cultural Renaissance movement in Taiwan had led to some aspects of Chinese Culture being better preserved there than in mainland China. An example of this preservation is the continued use of Traditional Chinese. The influence of Confucianism can be found in the behaviour of Taiwanese people, known for their friendliness and politeness.

The lifting of martial law ushered a period of democratization whereby Freedom of Speech and Expression led to a flourishing Taiwanese literature and Mass media in Taiwan.   
    
Reflecting the continuing controversy surrounding the political status of Taiwan, politics continues to play a role in the conception and development of a Taiwanese cultural identity, especially in its relationship to Chinese culture. In recent years, the concept of Taiwanese multiculturalism has been proposed as a relatively apolitical alternative view, which has allowed for the inclusion of mainlanders and other minority groups into the continuing re-definition of Taiwanese culture as collectively held systems of meaning and customary patterns of thought and behaviour shared by the people of Taiwan. Identity politics, along with the over one hundred years of political separation from mainland China, has led to distinct traditions in many areas, including cuisine and music.

Arts

Acclaimed classical musicians include violinist Cho-Liang Lin, pianist Ching-Yun Hu, and the Lincoln Center Chamber Music Society artist director Wu Han. Other musicians include Teresa Teng, Jay Chou and groups such as Mayday and heavy metal band Chthonic, led by singer Freddy Lim, which has been referred to as the "Black Sabbath of Asia".

Taiwanese films have won various international awards at film festivals around the world. Ang Lee, a Taiwanese director, has directed critically acclaimed films such as: Crouching Tiger, Hidden Dragon; Eat Drink Man Woman; Sense and Sensibility; Brokeback Mountain; Life of Pi; and Lust, Caution. Other famous Taiwanese directors include Tsai Ming-liang, Edward Yang, and Hou Hsiao-hsien. Taiwan has hosted the Golden Horse Film Festival and Awards since 1962.

Taiwan hosts the National Palace Museum, which houses more than 650,000 pieces of Chinese bronze, jade, calligraphy, painting, and porcelain and is considered one of the greatest collections of Chinese art and objects in the world.

Cuisine

 
Taiwanese culinary history is murky and is intricately tied to patterns of migration and colonization. Local and international Taiwanese cuisine, including its history, is a politically contentious topic. Famous Taiwanese dishes include Taiwanese beef noodle soup, Gua bao, Zongzi, Khong bah png, Taiwanese fried chicken, oyster vermicelli, Sanbeiji, and Aiyu jelly.

The Michelin Guide began reviewing restaurants in Taipei in 2018 and Taichung in 2020. In 2014 The Guardian called Taiwanese night markets the "best street food markets in the world".

Bubble tea, created in Taiwan in the 1980s, has now become a global phenomenon with its popularity spreading across the globe.

Popular culture
Karaoke, drawn from contemporary Japanese culture, is extremely popular in Taiwan, where it is known as KTV. KTV businesses operate in a hotel-like style, renting out small rooms and ballrooms according to the number of guests in a group. Many KTV establishments partner with restaurants and buffets to form all-encompassing and elaborate evening affairs for families, friends, or businessmen. Tour busses that travel around Taiwan have several TVs, primarily for singing karaoke.

Taiwan has a high density of 24-hour convenience stores, which, in addition to the usual services, provide services on behalf of financial institutions or government agencies, such as collection of parking fees, utility bills, traffic violation fines, and credit card payments. They also provide a service for mailing packages. Chains such as FamilyMart provide clothing laundry services, and it is possible to purchase or receive tickets for TRA and THSR tickets at convenience stores, specifically 7-Eleven, FamilyMart, Hi-Life and OK.

Sports

Baseball is commonly considered as Taiwan's national sport and is a popular spectator sport. Taiwan's dominance in international baseball was demonstrated when the men's team won top three medals across all levels of baseball in 2022, including the U-12, U-15, U-18, U-23, and Baseball5 competitions, the only team to do so in baseball history. Taiwan's men's baseball team and women's baseball team are world No.2 in the WBSC Rankings as of December 2021. The Chinese Professional Baseball League (CPBL) in Taiwan was established in 1989 and eventually absorbed the competing Taiwan Major League in 2003. As of 2021, the CPBL has five teams, with average attendance around 4,000 per game. Some elite players signed with overseas professional teams in the Major League Baseball (MLB) or the Nippon Professional Baseball (NPB). There have been sixteen Taiwanese MLB players in the United States as of the 2022 MLB Season, including former pitchers Chien-Ming Wang and Wei-Yin Chen. As for variations of baseball, Taiwan also has a strong women's softball team. The Chinese Taipei women's national softball team is currently ranked no.3 in the world based on the WBSC Rankings. The team recently won bronze medal at the 2022 World Games.

Besides baseball, basketball is Taiwan's other major sport. The P. League+ and T1 League are two Taiwan's professional basketball leagues. A semi-professional Super Basketball League (SBL) has also been in play since 2003. Other team sports including volleyball and football are practiced and sports leagues are run by Taiwanese sports governing bodies. Taiwan is also a major competitor in korfball.

Taiwan participates in international sporting organizations and events under the name of "Chinese Taipei" due to its political status. Taiwan has hosted several multi-sport events in the past, including the 2009 World Games in Kaohsiung and the 2009 Summer Deaflympics and 2017 Summer Universiade in Taipei. Taipei and New Taipei City will hold the 2025 Summer World Masters Games. Other major sporting events held by Taiwan on an annual basis include:
 Taipei Marathon (Marathon)
 New Taipei City Wan Jin Shi Marathon (Marathon)
 Taipei Open (Badminton)
 U-12 Baseball World Cup (Baseball)
 LPGA Taiwan Championship (Golf)
 William Jones Cup (Basketball)
 Tour de Taiwan (Road Bicycle Racing)

Taekwondo was introduced to Taiwan in 1966 for military training and has become a mature and successful combat sport in Taiwan. The first two Olympic gold medals won by Taiwanese athletes belong to the sport. In the 2004 Olympics, Chen Shih-hsin and Chu Mu-yen won gold medals in the women's flyweight event and the men's flyweight event, respectively. Subsequent taekwondo competitors have strengthened Taiwan's taekwondo culture.

There are many outstanding Taiwanese players at other individual sports, such as badminton, tennis, table tennis, and golf. Taiwan's strength in badminton is demonstrated by Tai Tzu-ying, who spent most weeks as world No. 1 women's singles player in BWF World Ranking, and her compatriots in the BWF World Tour. Taiwan also has a long history of strong international presence in table tennis. Five-time Olympian Chuang Chih-yuan made the most appearances at the Olympic Games among Taiwanese athletes. Yani Tseng is the youngest golf player ever, male or female, to win five major championships and was ranked number 1 in the Women's World Golf Rankings for 109 consecutive weeks from 2011 to 2013. In tennis, Hsieh Su-wei is the country's most successful female tennis player. She reached a career-high singles ranking of world No. 23 in 2013 and world No. 1 in the doubles rankings in 2014.

Calendar

The standard Gregorian calendar is used for most purposes in Taiwan. The year is often denoted by the Minguo era system which starts in 1912, the year the ROC was founded. 2023 is year 112 Minguo (民國112年). The East Asian date format is used in Chinese.

Prior to standardisation in 1929, the Chinese calendar was officially used. It is a Lunisolar calendar system which remains in use today for traditional festivals such as the Lunar New Year, the Lantern Festival, and the Dragon Boat Festival.

See also

 Index of Taiwan-related articles
 Outline of Taiwan

Notes

Words in native languages

References

Citations

Works cited

Further reading

 
 
 
 
 
 
 
 Copper, John F. ed. Historical dictionary of Taiwan (1993) online
 
 
 
 
 
 
 Taeuber, Irene B. "Population Growth in a Chinese Microcosm: Taiwan." Population Index 27#2 (1961), pp. 101–126 online

External links

Overviews and data
 Taiwan. The World Factbook. Central Intelligence Agency.
 Taiwan from UCB Libraries GovPubs
 Taiwan country profile BBC News
 Background Note: Taiwan US Department of State
 Taiwan's 400 years of history New Taiwan, Ilha Formosa
 Key Development Forecasts for Taiwan from International Futures
 Chinese Taipei OECD

Government agencies
 Office of the Government
 Office of the President
 Executive Yuan
 Judicial Yuan
 Control Yuan
 Examination Yuan
 Ministry of Foreign Affairs
 Republic of China (Taiwan) Embassies and Missions Abroad
 Taiwan, The Heart of Asia , Tourism Bureau, Republic of China (Taiwan)

 
 
1912 establishments in China
Articles containing video clips
Island countries
Northeast Asian countries
Chinese-speaking countries and territories
States and territories established in 1912
Taiwan placenames originating from Formosan languages
States with limited recognition
Republics
Former Japanese colonies
Former member states of the United Nations